1801 Titicaca is a stony Eos asteroid from the asteroid belt, approximately 22 kilometers in diameter. It was discovered on 23 September 1952, by Argentine astronomer Miguel Itzigsohn at La Plata Observatory in the capital of the province of Buenos Aires. It was named after Lake Titicaca in South America.

Orbit and classification 

Titicaca is a member of the Eos family, the largest asteroid family in the outer main belt consisting of nearly 10,000 asteroids. It orbits the Sun at a distance of 2.8–3.2 AU once every 5 years and 3 months (1,916 days). Its orbit has an eccentricity of 0.07 and an inclination of 11° with respect to the ecliptic. As no precoveries were taken, and no prior identifications were made, Titicacas observation arc begins with its official discovery observation.

Physical characteristics 

Titicaca is an assumed S-type asteroid.

Rotation period 

In March 2007, a rotational lightcurve of Titicaca was obtained from photometric observations taken by German amateur astronomer Axel Martin. It gave a well-defined rotation period of 3.2106 hours with a brightness variation of 0.50 in magnitude. A 2006-published lightcurve, constructed from photometry data from the Lowell photometric database, gave a concurring period of 3.211233 hours.

Diameter and albedo 

According to the surveys carried out by the Infrared Astronomical Satellite IRAS, the Japanese Akari satellite, and NASA's Wide-field Infrared Survey Explorer with its subsequent NEOWISE mission, Titicaca measures between 19.31 and 24.77 kilometers in diameter and its surface has an albedo between 0.11 and 0.18. The Collaborative Asteroid Lightcurve Link derives an albedo of 0.109 and a diameter of 23.08 kilometers.

Naming 

Naming citation was published on 8 April 1982.

References

External links 
 Asteroid Lightcurve Database (LCDB), query form (info )
 Dictionary of Minor Planet Names, Google books
 Asteroids and comets rotation curves, CdR – Observatoire de Genève, Raoul Behrend
 Discovery Circumstances: Numbered Minor Planets (1)-(5000) – Minor Planet Center
 
 

001801
Discoveries by Miguel Itzigsohn
Named minor planets
19520923